Manzano Mountains State Park is a state park of New Mexico, United States, located  north of Mountainair on the eastern slope of the Manzano Mountains. The park is popular for camping, bird-watching, hiking, and photography.

The Manzano Mountains are a part of the same geological feature that formed the Sandia Mountains to the north, but the Manzano Mountains are more remote and less developed.

References

External links
 Manzano Mountains State Park

State parks of New Mexico
Parks in Torrance County, New Mexico
Protected areas established in 1973
1973 establishments in New Mexico